Brigadier Flavia Byekwaso, is a Ugandan military officer, who serves as an elected member of parliament representing the Uganda People's Defence Forces (UPDF) in the 10th Parliament (2016–2021). On 1 August 2020, she was appointed Spokesperson of the UPDF, replacing Brigadier Richard Karemire, who was transferred to the East African Community headquarters as the Defence Liaison Officer. In January 2021 she was dropped as UPDF representative because of accusations of greed and incompetence.

Background and education
She was born on 29 December 1971, in the Central Region of Uganda. She attended St. Mathias Kalemba Senior Secondary School, in Nazigo, Kayunga District, for both her O-Level and A-Level studies.

Her first degree, a Bachelor of Business Administration, was awarded by Makerere University, Uganda's oldest and largest public university in 1996. Later, in 2012, she obtained a Master of Public Administration and Management degree, also from Makerere University.

Career
According to her biography at the website of the Ugandan parliament, Flavia Byekwaso was recruited by the Ugandan military in 2000, starting out as a protocol officer. Over time, she worked in different roles, including as a military assistant, as an administrative officer and as a logistics officer. She spent the years from 2014 until 2016 serving as the Director of Logistics in the Uganda People's Defence Forces.

In 2016, at the rank of lieutenant colonel, she was elected to be one of the ten military men and women who represent the UPDF in the 10th Parliament (2016–2021). In 2019, in a promotions exercise involving over 2,000 men and women in the UPDF, she was promoted from the rank of colonel to the rank of brigadier general. In her new capacity, she is the second highest-ranking woman in the UPDF, behind Proscovia Nalweyiso, whose new rank is lieutenant general.

Family
Brigadier Flavia Byekwaso is married.

Other considerations
In March 2016, the Daily Monitor reported that she had served in the past as part of the United Nations–African Union Mission in Darfur, Sudan.

See also
 Susan Lakot
 Rebecca Mpagi
 Annette Nkalubo
 Naomi Karungi

References

External links
Website of Parliament of Uganda

1971 births
Living people
Ganda people
Ugandan military personnel
Makerere University alumni
People from Central Region, Uganda
Ugandan generals
Members of the Parliament of Uganda
21st-century Ugandan politicians